The Hunger Games: Mockingjay – Part 2 is a 2015 American dystopian science fiction war film directed by Francis Lawrence from a screenplay by Peter Craig and Danny Strong, based on the 2010 novel Mockingjay by Suzanne Collins. The sequel to The Hunger Games: Mockingjay – Part 1 (2014), it is the fourth installment in The Hunger Games film series. It features an ensemble cast that includes Jennifer Lawrence, Josh Hutcherson, Liam Hemsworth, Woody Harrelson, Elizabeth Banks, Julianne Moore, Philip Seymour Hoffman and Donald Sutherland. Hoffman died in February 2014, marking his final film role.

The story continues from The Hunger Games: Mockingjay – Part 1 with Katniss Everdeen (Lawrence) preparing to win the war against President Snow (Sutherland) and the tyrannical Capitol. Together with Peeta, Gale, Finnick, and others, she travels to the Capitol to kill Snow. Principal photography on both parts of Mockingjay began on September 23, 2013, in Atlanta, before moving to Paris for two weeks of back-to-back filming and officially concluding on June 20, 2014, in Berlin and at Babelsberg Studio, which served as a co-producer.

The Hunger Games: Mockingjay – Part 2 premiered in Berlin on November 4, 2015, and was theatrically released in the United States on November 20, 2015, in 2D and IMAX, and internationally in 2D, 3D, RealD Cinema, and IMAX 3D in select territories; it is the only film in the series widely released in 3D. The film grossed $102 million gross over its opening weekend in North America, the sixth-biggest opening in 2015, and held the number one spot at the international box office for four consecutive weekends. The film grossed over $653 million worldwide, making it the ninth highest-grossing film of 2015, but the lowest-grossing installment in the series, falling below expectations both internationally and domestically.

Mockingjay – Part 2 received generally positive reviews from critics for its performances (particularly Lawrence, Hutcherson and Sutherland's), screenplay, musical score, and action sequences. It was criticized for splitting the final adaptation into two separate parts. The film was nominated for Best Fantasy Film at the 42nd Saturn Awards. It received three nominations at the 21st Empire Awards for Best Sci-Fi/Fantasy, Best Actress (Lawrence) and Best Production Design. For her part, Jennifer Lawrence was nominated for Best Actress in an Action Movie at the 21st Critics' Choice Awards. A prequel, The Hunger Games: The Ballad of Songbirds and Snakes, is scheduled to be released on November 17, 2023.

Plot
After being attacked by a hijacked (brainwashed) Peeta Mellark, Katniss Everdeen recovers from her injuries in District 13.  President Coin refuses to let Katniss go to the Capitol until they take District 2, so instead, she sends her to join the assault on the Capitol's armory in District 2, the last district controlled by the Capitol. Although she is able to rally the rebels and convince District 2 to join the rebellion, she is shot by a civilian, but merely injured due to her bulletproof Mockingjay costume.

Johanna covers for Katniss while she sneaks on board a helicopter on its way to the Capitol. Coin becomes aware of Katniss' defiance but plays along. Katniss is recruited into the Star Squad, which includes Gale and a recently married Finnick. The whole squad is given nightlock pills to take in case they are captured. Peeta, who is still not fully recovered, eventually joins them in the field to appear in the propaganda videos that the team is responsible for shooting in the wreckage of the city. Led by Boggs, the team makes their way to the Capitol, evading booby-trapped "pods" placed along the way with Boggs' holographic map called the Holo. In setting up for a shot in a courtyard, Boggs is fatally wounded by a pod and bestows the Holo on Katniss. In his final breath, he tells her the password to self-destruct the Holo and insists that she keep going, warning her of Coin. The squad then accidentally triggers another pod, releasing a flood of lethal black tar. As they flee, Peeta momentarily succumbs to his conditioning in the high-pressure situation and attacks Katniss, killing Mitchell in the process.

Katniss refuses to kill Peeta, but Gale states that he would kill him if needed. The group are then trapped in a building by Peacekeepers. As they try to figure out their next steps, Katniss lies and says that Coin has sent her on a mission to assassinate President Snow. The other group members know this is a lie, but they back Katniss up and decide to follow "Coin's" orders. The Leeg sisters stay behind in the building as a distraction so the group can escape the building. The Peacekeepers destroy the building and the Capitol broadcasts a video of the attack announcing Katniss' apparent death, which is then interrupted by Coin who delivers an impassioned eulogy for Katniss to rally the rebels. Realizing that everyone believes Katniss to be dead actually helps their cause, the team decides to continue on to the mansion and quietly assassinate Snow. The group travels into the sewers to make it across the Capitol without being detected or hurt by pods, but surveillance footage in the tunnels alerts Snow that Katniss is actually alive. He orders the release of genetically engineered "mutts" into the sewers, who ambush and kill several members of the group, including Finnick. Katniss uses the password on the Holo to self-destruct and cause an explosion that kills the rest of the mutts. The team escapes the sewers and takes shelter in a nearby house owned by former Hunger Games stylist and Snow's cousin, Tigris.

Snow invites Capitol citizens to take shelter in his mansion, forming a human shield around the mansion. After saying goodbye to Peeta, Katniss and Gale join the group of citizens in disguise in order to infiltrate the mansion. During this attempt, the rebels finally arrive at the Capitol and engage in a gunfight with the Peacekeepers, with several Capitol citizens being caught in the crossfire. The mansion gates remain closed to the Capitol citizens that arrive, and the children in the crowd are brought to the front so that they can enter first when they do. In all the confusion, a hovercraft marked with Capitol insignia drops bombs into the crowd. When a group of medics, including Katniss' sister, Prim, arrive to treat the wounded, the second wave of bombings occurs, killing Prim and knocking Katniss unconscious.

Katniss awakens, and Haymitch informs her that the rebels have finally won the rebellion. Katniss goes to face Snow in his greenhouse, where he is being held prisoner and awaiting execution. He explains to Katniss that Coin staged the bombing to turn his followers against him, and when she doesn't believe him, he reminds Katniss of their promise never to lie to one another. Katniss realizes Gale had suggested a similar strategy and confronts him about this when he comes to visit her. When Gale claims that he is not sure whose side the bombs came from, but that he cannot deny his part in Prim's death and regrets not being able to keep his promise of protecting her family, Katniss dismisses him.

Coin calls a meeting of the surviving Hunger Games victors, where she declares herself the interim President of Panem. Haymitch slyly asks how long "interim" might be, but Coin does not answer. To end the violence of the rebellion, she calls for a vote for a final, symbolic Hunger Games using the children of Capitol leaders as revenge. Some of the tributes, including Peeta, are immediately outraged, and others support the initiative. Katniss stays deliberately silent, and Coin asks her directly what she thinks after most of the tributes have cast their votes. After a moment to think, Katniss votes yes on the condition that she can execute Snow herself. After meeting Katniss' eyes at the table, Haymitch casts the tie-breaking final vote of "yes."

At Snow's execution, Katniss approaches Snow with her bow in hand. Overlooking them is Coin, and after a speech, Katniss shoots her dead instead. Coin falls from her podium and Snow begins to laugh, which causes a riot of citizens to converge on and kill Snow. Katniss then tries to swallow her nightlock pill, but Peeta rushes in to stop Katniss from committing suicide and she is then arrested. In captivity, Haymitch brings Katniss a letter from Plutarch that she refuses to read. Haymitch then reads it aloud to her; the letter assures Katniss that she will be pardoned, there will be no "last Hunger Games," and she will be able to return to District 12. He doesn't tell her this in person because he feels that he cannot be seen with her as Panem begins to heal under the leadership of Commander Paylor. Katniss remarks that the only person who's ever actually won the Hunger Games is Plutarch.

Returning home to District 12, Katniss tries to pick up the pieces of her old life. Prim's cat returns to the house, and Katniss has an outburst at the animal before breaking down into tears. One day, Katniss walks outside to find Peeta, who has almost fully recovered from his conditioning and returned home. They spend time together, sometimes with Haymitch, and receive a letter from Annie, Finnick's wife, telling them that they have had a son, that Katniss’ mother is still treating survivors, and that Gale was promoted to Captain. Commander Paylor is formally elected the new President of Panem.

Several years later, Katniss and Peeta play with their children in a meadow. Their infant cries from a nightmare, and Katniss ponders that they will eventually learn her story and about her time in the Games; She muses to her baby that when she has a nightmare, she plays a game wherein she imagines every good thing that she has ever seen anyone do. She says that the games get tedious at times, but that “there are much worse games to play.”

Cast

 Jennifer Lawrence as Katniss Everdeen
 Josh Hutcherson as Peeta Mellark
 Liam Hemsworth as Gale Hawthorne
 Woody Harrelson as Haymitch Abernathy
 Elizabeth Banks as Effie Trinket
 Julianne Moore as President Alma Coin
 Philip Seymour Hoffman as Plutarch Heavensbee
 Jeffrey Wright as Beetee
 Stanley Tucci as Caesar Flickerman
 Donald Sutherland as President Snow
 Willow Shields as Primrose Everdeen
 Sam Claflin as Finnick Odair
 Jena Malone as Johanna Mason
 Mahershala Ali as Boggs
 Natalie Dormer as Cressida
 Wes Chatham as Castor
 Michelle Forbes as Lieutenant Jackson
 Elden Henson as Pollux
 Patina Miller as Commander Paylor
 Evan Ross as Messalla
 Omid Abtahi as Homes

In addition to these twenty top-billed cast, Stef Dawson returned for her third appearance as Annie Cresta, Robert Knepper as Antonius, Paula Malcomson for her fourth appearance as Katniss’s mother, Eugenie Bondurant as Tigris, Gwendoline Christie as Commander Lyme, a previous victor from District 2. Twins Misty and Kim Ormiston as Leeg 1 and Leeg 2, and Joe Chrest as Mitchell, while Jennifer Lawrence's nephews, Theodore and Bear Lawrence, appear briefly as Katniss and Peeta's children.

Production

Pre-production
On July 10, 2012, Lionsgate announced that the film adaptation of Mockingjay would be split into two parts; The Hunger Games: Mockingjay – Part 1, released on November 21, 2014, and The Hunger Games: Mockingjay – Part 2, released November 20, 2015. On November 1, 2012, Francis Lawrence, director of The Hunger Games: Catching Fire, announced that he would return to direct both final films in the series. Talking about direction for last two parts Francis explains, "I felt a different kind of pressure," he explains. "[On The Hunger Games: Catching Fire], I had to prove myself a little bit as the new guy in the game. It was a relief that it was received well by the fans. Even though I was relieved, it was only momentary; it sort of set the bar higher for the next one!"

On December 6, 2012, Danny Strong announced that he would write the third and fourth films. On February 15, 2013, Lionsgate approved the script for Part 1 and gave Strong permission to write that of Part 2. In August, Hemsworth confirmed that shooting of the film would begin the following month.

The film's production began on September 16, 2013, in Boston, Atlanta, and Los Angeles. Studio Babelsberg co-produced and oversaw production services for the film. On November 13, 2013, producer Nina Jacobson revealed that Peter Craig was also hired to write the adaptations. The film carried a production budget of $160 million with a further $55 million spent on promotion and advertisements, and $13.9 million in television advertisements.

Casting

All the principal cast such as Jennifer Lawrence as Katniss, Josh Hutcherson as Peeta, Liam Hemsworth as Gale, Woody Harrelson as Haymitch, Donald Sutherland as President Snow, Elizabeth Banks as Effie, Willow Shields as Prim, Paula Malcomson as Katniss’ mother and Stanley Tucci as Caesar, return to reprise their roles. Julianne Moore also returned to reprise her role as President Alma Coin, along with Philip Seymour Hoffman, who died during the filming in February 2014, as Plutarch. He had nearly completed his scenes, and his two remaining scenes were rewritten to compensate for his absence. Regarding Hoffman's scenes, Francis Lawrence commented that, "He had two substantial scenes left and the rest were appearances in other scenes. We had no intention of trying to fake a performance, so we rewrote those scenes to give to other actors… The rest, we just didn't have him appear in those scenes. There's no digital manipulation or CG fabrication of any kind." One of the changed scenes saw the character of Plutarch sending Katniss a letter in prison, read by Haymitch, rather than coming himself to talk to her after her arrest for assassinating President Coin, explained as him being unable to see her for political reasons after her actions, which he nonetheless supports.

On August 26, 2013, it was announced that actress Stef Dawson had joined the cast to portray Annie Cresta. Lionsgate announced on September 13, 2013, that Julianne Moore joined the cast to play President Alma Coin. The same month, Lily Rabe, Patina Miller, Mahershala Ali, Wes Chatham, and Elden Henson were announced to have joined the cast, to reprise their roles of Commander Lyme, Commander Paylor, Boggs, Castor, and Pollux, respectively. During this time, there was also a casting call for extras. Rabe subsequently had to leave the film due to a scheduling conflict with the 2014 Shakespeare in the Park production of Much Ado About Nothing. On April 4, 2014, it was announced that she would be replaced by Gwendoline Christie to portray Lyme. Wyatt Russell was originally offered a role in both parts of Mockingjay, but his father Kurt confirmed in September 2013 that he turned down the offer to star in 22 Jump Street.

Filming

Principal photography began on September 23, 2013, in Atlanta, and concluded on June 20, 2014, in Berlin, Germany; the two parts were filmed back-to-back. In October 2013, filming took place in Rockmart, Georgia. After the cast and crew took a break to promote The Hunger Games: Catching Fire, filming resumed on December 2, 2013. On December 14, 2013, shooting was held at the Marriott Marquis in Atlanta. On December 18, shooting began at Caldwell Tanks in Newnan, Georgia.

Philip Seymour Hoffman died on February 2, 2014. He had completed filming his scenes for Part 1 and had a week left of shooting for Part 2; Lionsgate thereafter released a statement affirming that since the majority of Hoffman's scenes had been completed, the release date for Part 2 would not be affected. It was initially announced that Hoffman would be digitally recreated for a major scene involving his character that had not been shot, but Francis Lawrence later stated that he had rewritten Hoffman's two remaining scenes to compensate for the actor's absence, and there would be "no digital manipulation or CG fabrication of any kind". In a scene near the end of the film which was to have shown Plutarch speaking with Katniss in detention, Woody Harrelson's character instead reads her a letter from him.

Filming in Atlanta completed in mid-April 2014, and production moved to Europe. On May 9, filming took place in Les Espaces d'Abraxas complex in Noisy le Grand, Paris. It is the same location where Brazil (1985) was filmed 30 years earlier. Toward the end of May, the cast and crew shot scenes at several locations in Berlin and Brandenburg, Germany. In Rüdersdorf, Brandenburg, the crew shot scenes for the portrayal of District 8 in an old cement factory. Hemsworth was injured on the set and was brought to a doctor in the Berlin borough Mitte. Scenes for District 2 were shot at Berlin Tempelhof Airport. Scenes for the underground approach on the Capitol were filmed in the Metropolitan Area Outer Underground Discharge Channel in Japan. A German casting agency sought 1,000 ethnically diverse extras (African, Asian, Southern-European, and Turkish) and "lived faces" to shoot scenes at the Babelsberg Film Studio.

Music

Score

The film score was released on December 4, 2015. James Newton Howard returned to compose the film score; unlike the previous films in the series, there is no additional pop companion album with songs inspired by the film. Jennifer Lawrence performed "Deep in the Meadow", a lullaby that she sang in the first film.

Release

Marketing
Along with the film's first teaser poster, Lionsgate released a teaser trailer on March 18, 2015, titled The Hunger Games Franchise Logo — Remember, featuring the transformation of the Mockingjay, along with notable quotes from the previous three movies, as well as a quote from the new film. The teaser was also played at screenings of Lionsgate's The Divergent Series: Insurgent. Scott Mendelson of Forbes noted the similarity of the teaser with that of The Dark Knights (2008) teaser, which also features just an animated logo of the film and select dialogue. On June 1, a new teaser poster for the film, featuring a vandalised statue of President Snow, was revealed on the viral site TheCapitol.PN. On June 9, the teaser trailer for the film was released. A series of different posters, featuring the main cast with red Mockingjays painted on their faces, was released in July by Lionsgate.

Later in July 2015, Lionsgate released a motion and teaser poster and propaganda video, followed by the film's official trailer. In August, a poster was released stating "100 days until The Hunger Games: Mockingjay – Part 2". However, it was taken down shortly thereafter, as the text on the poster appeared to resemble a swear word due to layout. However, another "bold and beautiful" poster was released depicting Katniss standing on the shoulder of a fallen President Snow statue.

In October 2015, the first official clip and the final trailer were released, followed by the film's theatrical posters.

In certain parts of Israel, the poster which depicted the image of Katniss (Lawrence) aiming her bow and arrow was removed over concerns her image would offend ultra-conservative Jewish audiences. Instead, a fiery mockingjay in the poster's background replaced Lawrence in marketing materials in multiple locations in Israel including Bnei Brak and West Jerusalem. Lionsgate did not comment on the Israeli marketing campaign. In Jerusalem, public posters with the image of a female are often torn down, while Bnei Brak does not allow posters with female images.

Theatrical
The Hunger Games: Mockingjay – Part 2 premiered in Los Angeles, at the L.A. Live, complex on November 16, and in New York City on November 18. It premiered internationally in Berlin on November 4, in London November 5, in Paris November 9, in Madrid November 10, and in Beijing November 12. Due to the terrorist attacks in Paris on November 13, Lionsgate scaled down its L.A. premiere, cancelling press interviews on the red carpet (which was scheduled to last two hours). The stars mostly greeted fans and took a few photos before heading into the screening in Downtown Los Angeles. Mockingjay – Part 2 was released on November 20, 2015, in the United States and Canada. The film was originally scheduled to be released in 2D, Digital 3D, RealD 3D, and IMAX 3D, which would have made it the only film of the series to be globally released in 3D formats; the previous film was released in 3D in China. It is the third film in the franchise to be released in IMAX, following the first and the second film with the exception of the third film. However, the decision to release the film in 3D and IMAX 3D in North America was revoked. Director Francis Lawrence discussed the decision, stating, "I love the 3D format and I know that Mockingjay Part 2 will play perfectly in 3D and 2D internationally – but I'm pleased that we're maintaining the 2D only (and IMAX) formats domestically. It is the best of all worlds!". It was nevertheless released in 3D formats in overseas markets, including China. The film was also released in the Dolby Vision format in Dolby Cinemas, which is the first ever for Lionsgate.

Internationally, it was released day-and-date across 87 countries, starting from November 18, in certain markets like Belgium, Brazil, France and the Netherlands and on November 19 in Australia, Germany, Russia, Italy, and the United Kingdom, followed by China, Mexico, Japan, the United States, Canada, and 19 other markets, on November 20, as part of the biggest movie rollout ever by Lionsgate. The only big territories where the film did not open on the same weekend are Spain, Greece and India, which released the movie on November 27.

Home media
The Hunger Games: Mockingjay – Part 2 was released on Digital HD on March 8, 2016, and was followed by a Blu-ray and DVD release on March 22, 2016. It topped the home video sales chart for the week ending on March 27, 2016. The entire Hunger Games series was released on 4K UHD Blu-Ray on November 8, 2016.

Reception

Box office
The Hunger Games: Mockingjay – Part 2 fell short of expectations at the box office. It grossed a total of $281.7 million in the United States and Canada, and $376.6 million in other countries, for a worldwide total of $653.4 million. Its worldwide opening of $247.2 million is the 27th-highest of all time. It is the lowest-grossing film in The Hunger Games film series, and the ninth-highest-grossing film of 2015, Lionsgate's co-chairman Rob Friedman blamed the impact of the November 2015 Paris attacks as well as Star Wars: Episode VII – The Force Awakens for the film's underwhelming performance in certain European countries and in the U.S. and Canada, further blaming the latter for cutting the film's North American gross by as much as $50–100 million. Deadline Hollywood, noted that Mockingjay – Part 2 had the lowest opening among the series and was already grossing behind Mockingjay – Part 1 by $32.7 million or 12% before The Force Awakens even opened. Deadline also stated that the November attacks in Paris did not noticeably affect the European release of Mockingjay – Part 2. In China the film notably grossed a disappointing $21.5 million, which the studio blamed on the competition with The Martian and Spectre, along with Taiwanese film Our Times. Deadline Hollywood calculated the net profit of the film to be $134.3 million, when factoring together all expenses and revenues for the film.

North America
In North America, according to pre-release trackings, The Hunger Games: Mockingjay – Part 2 was initially projected to earn around $120–125 million in its opening weekend. However, estimates decreased to a mid-$110 million range once the film approached its opening day. It made $16 million from its Thursday night preview which is the lowest among the franchise but the third-highest of 2015, and $45.5 million on its opening day. In its opening weekend, the film grossed $102.7 million, finishing first at the box office but falling below expectations and becoming the lowest opening among the franchise. Sources attributed the franchise-low opening to heavy winter weather hitting areas such as South Dakota, Michigan, and Chicago as well as Lionsgate's decision to split the last novel into two separate pictures. Still, it is the fourth film in the Hunger Games film series to open with more than $100 million, and 2015's sixth-highest opening, behind Star Wars: The Force Awakens, Jurassic World, Avengers: Age of Ultron, Furious 7, and Minions. IMAX comprised $8.5 million of the opening gross from 384 IMAX locations. The below-expectations opening of the film led to the decline of Lionsgate stock the day after its opening weekend. The film retained the top spot at the box office in the second weekend, declining 49.3% and grossing $52 million. It topped the box office for the third consecutive weekend despite facing competition with the animated movie The Good Dinosaur and the horror comedy Krampus in its second and third weekend, respectively. In total, it held the No. 1 spot in the North American box office for four consecutive weekends (even after facing competition with In the Heart of the Sea in its fourth weekend), becoming the first film since Furious 7 to top the box office for four straight weekends and the second film in The Hunger Games film series after 2012's The Hunger Games to achieve this feat. Mockingjay – Part 2 grossed a total of $281 million, 17% less than Mockingjay – Part 1 and is also the lowest when compared with the two other films in the series.

Outside North America
Outside North America, the film was released in a total of 92 countries. It was projected by many box office analysts to surpass the openings of all the previous Hunger Games films, considering it was the last installment, and that its release date was the same in 87 markets, including China (the latter being a rare phenomenon). It was projected to gross around $165–185 million. However, it ended up earning $144.5 million across 32,500 screens from 87 markets opening at No. 1 in 81 of them. The underperformance was attributed to the 2015 Paris terror attacks, which affected many parts of Europe, and the rising value of the U.S. dollar. Earning $62 million (down 57%) and $30.05 million (down 49%) in its second and third weekend, respectively, it topped the international box office for four consecutive weekends.

The United Kingdom posted the highest opening with $17.1 million followed by China with $15.8 million, Germany ($15 million), Mexico ($8.9 million) France ($7.1 million), Australia ($6.8 million), Brazil ($6.8 million), Russia ($6.7 million), Venezuela ($5.6 million), and Italy ($4.3 million). In China, it opened at No. 1 despite facing competition with Taiwanese film Our Times, and the continued run of Spectre and having an underperforming opening. It fell precipitously by 88.6% in its second weekend, which is the worst second-weekend drop for any major Hollywood release in China of 2015. Notably in France, the opening was above expectations considering cinemagoers being affected by the Paris terror attacks and the heightened state of alert in Belgium at that time. It topped the United Kingdom and Ireland box office for four consecutive weekends which is a rare achievement and thereby becoming the first film since Les Misérables in 2013 to have four straight weeks of win at the UK box office. It was the highest-grossing film of 2015 in Colombia with $36 million. In terms of total earnings its largest markets are Germany ($43.7 million) and the United Kingdom ($43.1 million), and Colombia ($36 million).

Critical response
The Hunger Games: Mockingjay – Part 2 received generally positive reviews from critics, with praise for action sequences and performances but criticism for splitting the book into two separate adaptations. The website's critical consensus reads, "With the unflinchingly grim Mockingjay Part 2, The Hunger Games comes to an exciting, poignant, and overall satisfying conclusion." On Metacritic, the film has a weighted average score of 65 out of 100, based on 45 critics, indicating "generally favorable reviews". Audiences polled by CinemaScore gave the film an average grade of "A−" on an A+ to F scale.

Lawrence, Hutcherson, and Sutherland received praise for their performances. The supporting cast's performances, particularly Harrelson, Claflin, and Malone's, were also highly praised, but critics felt their appearances were too brief. Several critics also commented on the film's dark tone, even by comparison to its predecessors. Manohla Dargis from The New York Times praised Lawrence's character saying, "Katniss is the right heroine for these neo-feminist times." Stephen Whitty from New York Daily News said, "'Remember that line from the first 'Hunger Games' film: "May the odds be ever in your favor"? Yeah, well, that luck has run out'."

Leah Greenblatt of Entertainment Weekly remarked, "With its political power struggles and prodigious body count, all rendered in a thousand shades of wintry greige, the movie feels less like teen entertainment than a sort of Hunger Games of Thrones." Robbie Collin awarded the film four out of five stars and called the film "scorchingly tense". In his review for The Telegraph, he praised the film for "being intense" and lauded the performances of Lawrence and Hoffman."

Benjamin Lee, writing for The Guardian, felt that "the decision to split the final chapter of the dystopian saga into two chapters looms large over a frustratingly-paced mixture of thrilling action and surprisingly dark drama." He praised Jennifer Lawrence's acting and Francis Lawrence's direction and commented, "The decision to turn a 390-page book into over four hours' worth of screen time (and a bonus payday) has resulted in a patchy end to a franchise that started so promisingly." Tom Huddleston of Time Out gave the film four out of five stars. He praised the ending of the film as "genuinely powerful", and commented that "this might be the most downbeat blockbuster in memory, a film that starts out pitiless and goes downhill from there, save for a fleeting glimmer of hope in the final moments. It's a bold statement about the unforgiving nature of war, unashamedly political in its motives and quietly devastating in its emotional effect."

Accolades

Future

Potential spinoffs 
On August 8, 2017, Variety reported that Lionsgate CEO Jon Feltheimer has interest in having spinoffs made for The Hunger Games, and wants to create a writers room to explore the idea. When asked about the idea of The Hunger Games spinoffs, Jennifer Lawrence said "I think it's too soon. They've got to let the body get cold, in my opinion."

Prequel 

On June 17, 2019, Joe Drake, Chairman of the Lionsgate Motion Picture Group, announced in an interview that the company is communicating and working closely with Suzanne Collins with regards to an adaptation of her prequel Hunger Games novel, The Ballad of Songbirds and Snakes, which was released on May 19, 2020. He stated:

In April 2020, Collins and Lionsgate confirmed plans were underway for the movie's development. Francis Lawrence was confirmed to return as director following his success with The Hunger Games trilogy. The scriptwriter will be Michael Arndt, with Nina Jacobson and author Suzanne Collins as producers. It is scheduled to be released on November 17, 2023. Tom Blyth portrays a younger Coriolanus Snow while Rachel Zegler, Hunter Schafer, Jason Schwartzman, Peter Dinklage, Viola Davis, Burn Gorman, and Fionnula Flanagan have been cast as Lucy Gray Baird, Tigris Snow, Lucretius "Lucky" Flickerman, Casca Highbottom, Dr. Volumnia Gaul, Commander Hoff, and Grandma'am, respectively.

References

External links 

 
 
 

3 Part 2
2010s English-language films
2015 films
2015 3D films
2010s adventure films
2015 drama films
2015 science fiction films
2010s teen films
2010s thriller films
American 3D films
American adventure drama films
American films about revenge
American science fiction thriller films
American sequel films
Babelsberg Studio films
Films scored by James Newton Howard
Films directed by Francis Lawrence
Films set in North America
Films shot in Atlanta
Films shot in Georgia (U.S. state)
Films shot in Paris
Films shot in Berlin
IMAX films
Lionsgate films
Films about mass murder
Science fiction adventure films
Films with screenplays by Danny Strong
Teen adventure films
Films with screenplays by Peter Craig
Films produced by Jon Kilik
2010s American films